Vladyslav Hennadiyovych Sirenko (born 7 February 1995) is a Ukrainian professional boxer. As an amateur he won a silver medal in the super-heavyweight division at the 2013 European Youth Championships.

Amateur career
Sirenko compiled an amateur record of 125–25. His highlights included winning gold medals at the 2012 and 2013 Ukrainian Youth Championships, and a silver medal at the 2013 European Youth Championships.

Professional career
Sirenko made his professional debut on 26 May 2017, scoring a first-round knockout (KO) over Emmanuel Mnengi at the Sibaya Casino & Entertainment Kingdom near Durban, South Africa.

Professional boxing record

References

Living people
1995 births
Ukrainian male boxers
Sportspeople from Kyiv
Heavyweight boxers